The Bypass is a 2003 short silent Bollywood film with actors  Nawazuddin Siddiqui, Irfan Khan and Sundar Dan Detha. The film was written and directed by Amit Kumar. The Bypass was filmed on a stranded road somewhere in Rajasthan, India. The film was shown at the Edinburgh International Film Festival and Aubagne Film Festival.

Plot 
The film is about two friends who stay by the stranded road "Bypass" and a corrupt police officer. The two friends frequently mug and ultimately kill the people who travel by the road. Amit Kumar starts the film by showing a couple traveling by the road, and then Nawazuddin Siddiqui stops the car by throwing a rock. The two friends then steal money and graphically kill the pair. Irrfan Khan's role as a corrupt police officer is established when he takes a watch by cutting the wrist of a dead man, then rapes a lady and tries to kill the two muggers for the money they had. The director represents the thrill of "Bypass" through violence and aggression.

Cast
 Nawazuddin Siddiqui - 1st Mugger
Sundar Dan Detha	- 2nd Mugger
 Irrfan Khan - Corrupt Policeman 
 Manorama Goswami - Kidnapped Girl
 Kasturi	Kasturi - Woman in the Jeep
 Karuna Pandey - Woman in Car
 Ashwin Chaddha- Man in Car
 Kalyan Singh- Jeep Driver

References

External links

Films shot in India
2003 films
Films about rape
2000s Hindi-language films
Indian silent films
Indian drama road movies